is an autobahn in Germany.

The A 270 was created in 2001 as a redesignation of the freeway into the northern part of Bremen. Previously, the freeway was known as the B 74n Lesumerschnellweg. The freeway replaced the route of the B 74 through the populated areas of northern Bremen.

Recent plans called for an extension of the A 270 around the northern and eastern boundaries of Farge, to end across the street from the terminal of the Farge - Berne ferry. This project was opened to traffic on 9 December 2009. However, it was a built as an at-grade expressway instead, thus requiring the return of the B 74n designation.

Because it cuts through a densely developed area, the A 270 is below normal autobahn standards for most of its route. The speed limit for the entire route is 80 km/h (50 mph), and in many places there is no hard shoulder. The A 270 ends just before the A 27/E 234, a short distance after crossing into Lower Saxony. The connection with the A 27 is made at an at-grade intersection.

As is expected for urban freeways, some of the junctions are only accessible from one direction; one junction (3b, Lobbendorf) does not permit autobahn traffic to exit at all.

Exit list

 
Road continues as the B 74 n towards Berne

  
 
Road continues as the B 74 towards Osterholz-Scharmbeck
|}

References

External links
 Autobahn Atlas: A270

270